The Broadcast Tapes of Dr. Peter is a 1993 Canadian documentary film produced by Arthur Ginsberg. It was nominated for an Academy Award for Best Documentary Feature. The film is based upon the video diary of Peter Jepson-Young, better known as "Dr. Peter", which documented his life as a person with AIDS.

The film was originally broadcast as an episode of the CBC Television documentary series Witness, and was later picked up for broadcast in the United States by HBO.

References

External links

Watch The Broadcast Tapes of Dr. Peter on the CBC Player
The Broadcast Tapes of Dr. Peter at Direct Cinema Limited

1993 films
1993 documentary films
1993 short films
1993 LGBT-related films
1990s short documentary films
Canadian short documentary films
Documentary films about HIV/AIDS
Canadian LGBT-related television films
Documentary films about gay men
Canadian documentary television films
1990s English-language films
HIV/AIDS in Canadian films
1990s Canadian films
Canadian LGBT-related short films